Dunalley is a rural / residential locality in the local government areas (LGA) of Sorell (37%) and Tasman (63%) in the South-east LGA region of Tasmania. The 2016 census recorded a population of 304 for the state suburb of Dunalley.
It is a small fishing village on the east coast of Tasmania.

It is located on the narrow isthmus which separates the Forestier and Tasman Peninsulas from the rest of Tasmania.

History 
Dunalley was gazetted as a locality in 1967.

The Denison canal, with a swing bridge for road traffic, has been cut between Dunalley Bay and Blackman Bay to allow boats easy access between the two bays. It was originally hand dug. The project started in 1901 and was completed in 1905. In 1965 a new hydraulic swing bridge replaced the original bridge. It is common for Sydney–Hobart yacht racers returning to Sydney to use the canal as a convenient shortcut.

Dunalley was badly affected by bushfires on 4 January 2013, with the town losing about 65 structures, including the police station, school, bakery and local residences.

Dunalley was first named East Bay Neck but was renamed Dunalley after Henry Prittie, 3rd Baron Dunalley (1807-1885). Dunalley came from Kilboy in the County of Tipperary, Ireland.

A survey map of the region that became Dunalley (from the 1800s) is available online to the public.

Geography
The waters of Frederick Henry Bay and Norfolk Bay form part of the southern boundary. The waters of Blackman Bay and Marion Bay form parts of the northern and eastern boundaries.

Road infrastructure
Route A9 (Arthur Highway) runs through from north to south.

References

East Coast Tasmania
Fishing communities in Australia
Forestier Peninsula
Localities of Tasman Council
Localities of Sorell Council
Towns in Tasmania